Yuki Ikari (井狩 裕貴, Ikari Yūki, born 21 August 2000) is a Japanese swimmer. He competed in the 2020 Summer Olympics.

References

2000 births
Living people
Sportspeople from Okayama
Swimmers at the 2020 Summer Olympics
Japanese male medley swimmers
Olympic swimmers of Japan
Universiade medalists in swimming
Universiade gold medalists for Japan
Medalists at the 2019 Summer Universiade
21st-century Japanese people